Neykovo is a village in Kavarna Municipality, Dobrich Province in northeastern Bulgaria.

References

Villages in Dobrich Province